Bilateral relations between modern-day Armenia and the Russian Federation were established on 3 April 1992, though Russia has been an important actor in Armenia since the early 19th century. The two countries' historic relationship has its roots in the Russo-Persian War of 1826 to 1828 between the Russian Empire and Qajar Persia after which Eastern Armenia was ceded to Russia. Moreover, Russia was viewed as a protector of the Christian subjects in the Ottoman Empire, including the Armenians.

After the dissolution of the Soviet Union, Armenia has shared Russia's approach aimed at strengthening the Commonwealth of Independent States (CIS). Armenia and Russia are both members of a military alliance, the Collective Security Treaty Organization (CSTO), along with four other ex-Soviet countries, a relationship that Armenia finds essential to its security. Among the contracts and the agreements, which determine intergovernmental relations – a treaty of friendship, collaboration and mutual aid of 29 August 1997 are a number of the documents, which regulate bases of Russian military units and liaisons in Armenia. Armenia became a full member of the Eurasian Economic Union on 2 January 2015.

Background 

The significant part of the territory currently belonging to Armenia was incorporated into the Russian Empire pursuant to the 1828 Treaty of Turkmenchay signed between Russia and Persia following the Russo-Persian War (1826–28).

After the 1917 Russian Revolution, Armenia gained short-lived independence as the First Republic of Armenia. By 1920, the state was incorporated into the Transcaucasian Socialist Federative Soviet Republic, a founding member of the Soviet Union that was formally constituted in 1922. In 1936, the Transcaucasian state was dissolved, leaving its constituent states, including the Armenian Soviet Socialist Republic, as full Union republics.

The modern Armenia became independent in 1991 as a consequence of the dissolution of the Soviet Union due to the failed coup that happened in August. Armenia boycotted the union-wide preservation vote earlier that year.

The Russian Federation, the successor state of the Soviet Union, is believed to have been instrumental in achieving victory by Armenians in the First Nagorno-Karabakh War (1988–1994). In 2013, the deputy prime-minister of Azerbaijan Ali S. Hasanov said, "We need to become much stronger so that if we become involved in combat in Nagorno-Karabakh we can stand up to Russian troops, because that is who we will have to face. Did Armenia occupy our territories? Do you think Armenia's power is sufficient for that?”

Developments since 2013

Faced with the choice of either joining the Russia-led Customs Union or signing the Association Agreement with the European Union, Armenia eventually chose the former option. The decision on Armenia's accession to the Customs Union was announced by the president of Armenia Serzh Sargsyan on 3 September 2013.

On 2 December 2013, Russian president Vladimir Putin arrived to Armenia on an official visit. The heads of the two states discussed Armenia's accession to the Customs Union and signed 12 agreements on enhancing cooperation in a number of key spheres such as security, economy, energy and others. Russia also reduced the gas price for Armenia from 270 to 189 dollars per 1,000 cubic meters and enlarged the existing Russian military bases in Armenia.

Armenia became a full member of the Eurasian Economic Union from January 2, 2015, whereupon cooperation and integration with Russia reached a new level.

Gyumri murders 

On 12 January 2015, Valery Permyakov, a Russian soldier from the 102nd military base in Gyumri, murdered an Armenian family of seven during the night. He was formally charged under the Armenian Criminal Code but still held at the 102nd military base. On 15 January, popular protests broke out in Gyumri demanding that Permyakov be handed over to the Armenian justice system. A protest rally was also held at Freedom Square in Yerevan, where 20 people were detained due to clashes with police. In August 2015, Permyakov was convicted by the Russian military court on a number of charges excluding murder; in August 2016, the Armenian court that held the hearings in the compound of Russia's 102nd military base found Valery Permyakov guilty on a series of charges including murder, and sentenced him to life in prison. The court's ruling was upheld in December 2016 by the Appeals Court in Yerevan.

Relations under Nikol Pashinyan (since 2018)
Relations between the countries′ governments strained following the election of Nikol Pashinyan as prime minister of Armenia in May 2018. Pashinyan has been compared by Russian politicians and media to Ukraine's Petro Poroshenko, who was elected president shortly after the pro-Western 2014 Ukrainian revolution. Tensions were further raised following the arrests of former president Robert Kocharyan and CSTO secretary general Yuri Khatchaturov as well as business disputes involving Russian companies operating in Armenia.

Russia was described as reluctant to openly intervene in the 2020 Nagorno-Karabakh war in support of Armenia due to the ongoing tensions between Putin and Pashinyan. Russia ultimately held peace talks between Azerbaijan and Armenia, culminating in a ceasefire agreement of 10 October, which was subsequently disregarded by both sides. The war was halted when the belligerents′ leaders and president of Russia signed an armistice agreement in Moscow on 9 November 2020.

In March 2022, after the commencement of the Russian invasion of Ukraine, over 40,000 Russian professionals and programmers fled to Yerevan. Half stayed briefly and then moved on. The rest reestablished themselves using internet connections that kept Armenia connected to the world while Russia was increasingly cut off. In addition to IT experts, the exodus included many bloggers, journalists and activists who faced arrest for criticizing the war in Ukraine. Interviews indicated that none of the exiles encountered hostility in Yerevan. They can enter Armenia without visas or passports and remain six months; Russian is widely spoken.

Relations between Russia and Armenia continued to deteriorate throughout Russia's invasion of Ukraine. In February 2023, Armenia refused to return to Moscow for negotiations while the Lachin corridor was closed. Russian Foreign Minister Sergey Lavrov publicly acknowledged Azerbaijan's rationale for the 2020 aggression.

Military union and cooperation 

Military cooperation between Armenia and Russia is based on both states being members of the military alliance (CSTO) as well as participants in the Joint CIS Air Defense System. Russia maintains in Gyumri (formerly, Alexandropol), north of Yerevan, one of its military bases abroad (102nd Military Base) as part of Russia's Transcaucasian Group of Forces; the relevant treaty was extended until 2044 in 2010. Moscow also undertook to supply Armenia with more weapons and military hardware. On 8 December 2015, the Erebuni base (part of 102nd) was reinforced with six advanced Mi-24P assault helicopters and an Mi-8MT transport helicopter delivered from the Russian Air Force base in the Krasnodar region.

The Russian border guards directorate in Armenia (c. 4,500 strong) along with the Armenian border guards is responsible for the protection of the Soviet-era border of Armenia with Turkey and Iran.

In October 2013, the chief commander of Russia's 102nd military base Andrey Ruzinsky told Russia's official military newspaper, "If Azerbaijan decides to restore jurisdiction over Nagorno-Karabakh by force, the [Russian] military base may join in the armed conflict in accordance with the Russian Federation’s obligations within the framework of the Collective Security Treaty Organization."

On 23 December 2015, Russian defence minister Sergey Shoygu and his Armenian counterpart, Seyran Ohanyan, signed an agreement to form a Joint Air Defense System in the Caucasus. The conclusion of the agreement followed the Armenian minister's assertion that the ceasefire with Azerbaijan over the breakaway region of Nagorno-Karabakh virtually no longer existed. In June 2016, Armenia's National Assembly voted 102–8 to ratify an agreement to create an Armenia–Russia joint air defense system.

In 2016, it was reported by media that Armenia had received from the Russian state a divizion of Iskander-M ballistic missiles (earlier, in 2013, it was revealed that Russia had deployed several Iskander missile systems at undisclosed locations throughout Armenia.) In February 2017, the Defence minister of Armenia told a Russian mass media outlet that the Iskander missiles stationed in Armenia and shown at the military parade in September 2016 were owned and operated by the Armed Forces of Armenia.

In November 2016, Russian president Vladimir Putin approved a government proposal on creating joint Russian and Armenian military forces. The two sides were to set up a joint command, whose leader would be appointed by the Supreme Commander of the Armenian Armed Forces in agreement with the Supreme Commander of the Russian Armed Forces. In early October 2017, the relevant bilateral treaty was ratified by the Armenian parliament.

In mid-October 2017, the Armenian cabinet approved a bill for signing a $100 million worth credit agreement with Russia to facilate the weapons purchase in line with the domestic legislation.

Resident diplomatic missions
 Armenia has an embassy in Moscow and consulates-general in Rostov-on-Don and Saint Petersburg and a consular office in Sochi.
 Russia has an embassy in Yerevan and a consulate-general in Gyumri.

See also  
Foreign relations of Armenia 
Foreign relations of Russia
Armenians in Russia
Electric Yerevan
Permanent Mission of Armenia to the CSTO
Russians in Armenia

References

External links 

Armenia signs a cooperation agreement with Russia Alrosa

 
Bilateral relations of Russia
Russia
Relations of colonizer and former colony